Cloperastine (INN) or cloperastin, in the forms of cloperastine hydrochloride (JAN) (brand names Hustazol, Nitossil, Seki) and cloperastine fendizoate (or hybenzoate), is an antitussive and antihistamine that is marketed as a cough suppressant in Japan, Hong Kong, and in some European countries. It was first introduced in 1972 in Japan, and then in Italy in 1981.

Side effects
Adverse effects may include sedation, drowsiness, heartburn, and thickening of bronchial secretions.

Pharmacology
The precise mechanism of action of cloperastine is not fully clear, but several different biological activities have been identified for the drug, of which include: ligand of the σ1 receptor (Ki = 20 nM) (likely an agonist), GIRK channel blocker (described as "potent"), antihistamine (Ki = 3.8 nM for the H1 receptor), and anticholinergic. It is thought that the latter two properties contribute to side effects, such as sedation and somnolence, while the former two may be involved in or responsible for the antitussive efficacy of cloperastine.

Synthesis

The halogenation of 4-Chlorobenzhydrol [119-56-2] (1) with phosphorus tribromide in tetrachloromethane gives 1-(Bromophenylmethyl)-4-chlorobenzene [948-54-9] (2). Treatment with ethylenechlorohydrin (2-Chloroethanol) [107-07-3] (3) gives 1-(4-Chlorobenzhydryl)oxy-2-chloroethane [5321-46-0] (4). Reaction with piperidine (5) completes the synthesis of Cloperastine (6).

See also 
 Cough syrup
 Noscapine
 Codeine; Pholcodine
 Dextromethorphan; Dimemorfan
 Racemorphan; Dextrorphan; Levorphanol
 Butamirate
 Pentoxyverine
 Tipepidine
 Levocloperastine

References 

Antitussives
Chlorobenzenes
Ethers
H1 receptor antagonists
Muscarinic antagonists
1-Piperidinyl compounds
Potassium channel blockers
Sigma receptor ligands